The Bundesvision Song Contest (often shortened BSC or BuViSoCo) was a song competition held annually between the sixteen states of Germany. Created by German entertainer Stefan Raab and aired live on ProSieben, the show was loosely based on the Eurovision Song Contest, with slightly different rules aiming at promoting German-language music by requiring that at least 50% of each song's lyrics were performed in German.

History 

The Bundesvision Song Contest was created by Stefan Raab in 2005, in the vein of the Eurovision Song Contest. The contest was held annually between 2005 and 2015, however, after Raab retired in late 2015, the 2016 edition of the contest was not held, although the show was not officially cancelled. The contest was not held since, and in June 2019, ProSieben stated that it was not planning to produce further editions.

Format 
The Bundesvision Song Contest followed a similar format as the Eurovision Song Contest: All sixteen states of Germany (German: Bundesländer) entered one song that was performed live on the night of the show, and once all states have performed, a winner was decided by tele-vote.

Contests

Total ranking

Presenters

References

External links

 
Production website

 
2005 German television series debuts
2015 German television series endings
German-language television shows
ProSieben original programming
Song contests
German music television series
Pop music festivals
2005 establishments in Europe